Chhuta Chheda is an Indian Gujarati soap opera which aired on ETV Gujarati. Now airs on colors gujrati channel and streams worldwide on Voot

Synopsis
Chhuta Chheda tackles the ideas of divorce and problems within relationships. The show shows the viewers real-life stories about couples and how they resolved them. It also shows the audience what causes problems within couples; as well as how we can resolve them. It was an episodic show with two seasons.

Cast
 Manas Shah
 Shrenu Parikh
 Krishna Gokani
 Eva Ahuja
 Paresh Bhatt
 Bhoomi Shukla
 Shreya Bugade
Mehul Buch
Ragini Shah
 Shruti Gholap
 Jayaka Yagnik
 Rittesh Mobh
 Kalpesh Chauhan and Several Renowned Actors were part of these episodic stories.

External links
 Official website

Indian television series
2011 Indian television series debuts
Television shows set in Gujarat
Colors Gujarati original programming
Gujarati-language television shows